The 12319 / 20 Kolkata Chitpur–Agra Cantonment Superfast Express is a Superfast Express train belonging to Indian Railways – Eastern Railway zone that runs between Kolkata Chitpur and  in India.

It operates as train number 12319 from Kolkata Chitpur to Agra Cantonment and as train number 12320 in the reverse direction, serving the states of West Bengal, Jharkhand, Bihar and Uttar Pradesh.

Coaches

The 12319 / 20 Kolkata Chitpur–Agra Cantonment Superfast Express has 1 AC 2 tier, 4 AC 3 tier, 8 sleeper class, 3 general unreserved and 2 EoG (generator van) coaches. It does not carry a pantry car.

Now the full rake is using LHB coach.

As is customary with most train services in India, coach composition may be amended at the discretion of Indian Railways depending on demand.

Service

As the average speed of the train is above , as per Indian Railway rules, its fare includes a Superfast surcharge.

Routeing

Traction

As sections of the route are yet to be fully electrified, a Howrah-based WAP-4 hauls the locomotive from Kolkata Chitpur until  handing over to a Lucknow or Gonda-based WDM-3A which powers the train for the remainder of its journey.

Rake sharing
This train shares its rake with:
 12357/12358 Durgiana Express
 13135/13136 Kolkata–Jaynagar Weekly Express

Operation

12319 Kolkata Agra Cantonment Express runs from Kolkata Chitpur every Wednesday reaching Agra Cantonment on the next day.

12320 Agra Cantonment Kolkata Express runs from Agra Cantonment every Thursday reaching Kolkata Chitpur on the next day.

References

External links

Transport in Kolkata
Trains from Agra
Express trains in India
Rail transport in West Bengal
Rail transport in Jharkhand
Rail transport in Bihar